Season 1993–94 was the 110th football season in which Dumbarton competed at a Scottish national level, entering the Scottish Football League for the 88th time, the Scottish Cup for the 99th time, the Scottish League Cup for the 47th time and the Scottish Challenge Cup for the fourth time.

Overview 
The new league campaign would have added importance as the league structure was once again being revised for 1994-95, with four divisions being created, and the addition of two new clubs, Ross County and Inverness Caledonian Thistle.  As it was, results were up and down from the start, but while Dumbarton finished one place short of First Division football, they never really threatened that all important 7th place, finishing 6 points behind Ayr United in 8th.

In the national cup competitions, it was a case of a second successive season of falling at the first hurdle.  In the Scottish Cup it would be Premier Division champions elect, Rangers, that would defeat Dumbarton in the third round.

In the League Cup, it was Rangers again who defeated Dumbarton by just a single goal in the second round - and it would be Rangers that would lift the trophy at the end of the season.

Finally, it was a fourth time first round exit in the B&Q Cup - a disappointing defeat to Second Division Stranraer.

Locally, in the Stirlingshire Cup, competition was split into two qualifying sections, and having topped their section of Falkirk, Stenhousemuir and East Stirling, Dumbarton went on to win the trophy in the final against Alloa Athletic, on penalties, after a scoreless draw.

Results & fixtures

Scottish First Division

Scottish League Cup

B&Q Cup

Tennant's Scottish Cup

Stirlingshire Cup

Pre-season and other matches

League table

Player statistics

Squad 

|}

Transfers

Players in

Players out

Reserve team
Dumbarton competed in the Scottish Reserve League (West B), and with 9 wins and 4 draws from 24 games, finished 7th of 9.

In the Reserve League Cup, Dumbarton lost out to St Johnstone in the first round.

Trivia
 The League match against Clyde on 14 August marked Charlie Gibson's 200th appearance for Dumbarton in all national competitions - the 21st Dumbarton player to break the 'double century'.
 The League match against Ayr United on 6 November marked Ian MacFarlane's 100th appearance for Dumbarton in all national competitions - the 107th Dumbarton player to reach this milestone.
 The crowd of 36,671 at Ibrox for the Scottish Cup tie against Rangers on 24 January was the largest to have ever witnessed a Dumbarton match. This beat the previous record set just 5 months earlier, in a League Cup tie against the same opponents at the same venue.

See also
 1993–94 in Scottish football

References

External links
Scottish Football Historical Archive

Dumbarton F.C. seasons
Scottish football clubs 1993–94 season